Astiria is a genus of flowering plants belonging to the family Malvaceae.

Its native range is Mauritius.

It has one accepted species, Astiria rosea .

References

Dombeyoideae
Malvaceae genera
Endemic flora of Mauritius
Monotypic Malvales genera